Eumermis is a genus of nematodes belonging to the family Mermithidae.

Species:
 Eumermis pangodiensis Rubzov, 1980

References

Mermithidae